Mark Lamsfuß (born 19 April 1994) is a German badminton player and plays for the BC Wipperfeld. He and his partner, Isabel Lohau won a bronze medal in mixed doubles at the 2022 BWF World Championships.

Career 
Lamsfuß started playing badminton at aged 3, and in 2013 he won the Dutch Open Junior tournament in the mixed doubles event partnered with Franziska Volkmann. He and Volkmann also won bronze at the 2013 European Junior Badminton Championships.

He became the Germany national badminton team in 2013, and at that year he reach the men's doubles semifinal round of the senior tournament at the Irish Open International Challenge with Fabian Holzer. In 2016, he clinched the mixed doubles title at the National Championships tournament partnered with Isabel Herttrich from BC Bischmisheim. He won his first BWF International tournament at the 2017 Orleans International in the mixed doubles event partnered with Herttrich.

In 2021, he competed at the European Championships in Kyiv, Ukraine, reaching the semi finals in the mixed doubles with Herttrich and the finals in the men's doubles with Seidel. Unfortunately, he was tested positive for Covid-19, and the organizers decided to cancel the finals. Nevertheless, Lamsfuß then received a silver and a bronze medal for his achievements in the tournament. In July, he competed at the 2020 Summer Olympics in the men's and mixed doubles but was eliminated in the group stage in both events.

Achievements

BWF World Championships 
Mixed doubles

European Championships 
Men's doubles

Mixed doubles

European Junior Championships 
Mixed doubles

BWF World Tour (4 titles, 5 runners-up) 
The BWF World Tour, which was announced on 19 March 2017 and implemented in 2018, is a series of elite badminton tournaments sanctioned by the Badminton World Federation (BWF). The BWF World Tour is divided into levels of World Tour Finals, Super 1000, Super 750, Super 500, Super 300 (part of the HSBC World Tour), and the BWF Tour Super 100.

Men's doubles

Mixed doubles

BWF International Challenge/Series (3 titles, 3 runners-up) 
Men's doubles

Mixed doubles

  BWF International Challenge tournament
  BWF International Series tournament
  BWF Future Series tournament

References

External links 
 

1994 births
Living people
People from Wipperfürth
Sportspeople from Cologne (region)
German male badminton players
Badminton players at the 2020 Summer Olympics
Olympic badminton players of Germany
Badminton players at the 2019 European Games
European Games competitors for Germany